Valerie Carol Marian Vaz (born 7 December 1954) is a British Labour Party politician and solicitor serving as the Member of Parliament (MP) for Walsall South since 2010. She served as the Shadow Leader of the House of Commons from 2016 to 2021 in the Shadow Cabinets of Jeremy Corbyn and Keir Starmer.

Background
Vaz was born in Aden (now part of Yemen) to Anthony Xavier and Merlyn Verona Vaz. Her family originates from Goa, India, and settled in Twickenham and then East Sheen, London. Vaz is a distant relative of Saint Joseph Vaz, a 17th-century missionary. Her father, previously a correspondent for The Times of India, worked in the airline industry, while her mother worked two jobs, as a teacher and for Marks & Spencer. Her father died by suicide when she was 16.

Vaz was educated at Twickenham County Grammar School and later Bedford College. She attended the University of London, where she completed a BSc (Hons) degree in Biochemistry in 1978. The same year, she matriculated at Sidney Sussex College, Cambridge, to do research, but did not take a degree.

In 1984 she qualified as a solicitor and subsequently worked on legal issues for local government in London. She set up her own law firm, Townsend Vaz Solicitors, and has sat as a Deputy District Judge in the County Court on the Midland and Oxford Circuit.

In 2001, she joined the Government Legal Service, and worked at the Treasury Solicitors Department and the Ministry of Justice. She worked as a presenter and interviewer for the BBC TV programme Network East in 1987.

Political career
Vaz was a councillor in the London Borough of Ealing from 1986 to 1990, and the council's Deputy Leader from 1988 to 1989. She stood unsuccessfully as a parliamentary candidate in the constituency of Twickenham in the 1987 general election, and in the 1999 European elections in the East Midlands. She was a contender to be selected as a Labour candidate for the 2000 West Bromwich West by-election but was not selected. She went on to be selected as the prospective Labour candidate to be MP for Walsall South after winning a women-only shortlist.

She was elected in the 2010 general election, securing the Walsall South seat with a reduced Labour majority of 1,755 (8.2% swing to the Conservative Party).

In June 2010 she was selected as a Labour member of the Health Select Committee. She was also Vice Chairwoman of the Labour Parliamentary Party, having been elected by fellow Labour MPs.

In the 2015 general election, she was re-elected as the member of parliament for Walsall South, with an increased majority of 6,007 (5% swing to the Labour Party). In the 2015–2017 parliament, she served on the Science and Technology Committee followed by the Environment, Food and Rural Affairs Committee. In October 2016 she was appointed to Jeremy Corbyn's shadow cabinet as the Shadow Leader of the House of Commons.

In the 2017 general election, she was elected for a third time at Walsall South, with an increased majority of 8,892.

In 2018, it was revealed that two former members of her parliamentary staff had alleged that they were bullied by Valerie Vaz, but the complaints were not followed up by the party. 

In 2019, she was appointed to the Privy Council. In the 2019 general election, Vaz held her seat with a reduced majority of 3,456.

She continued in her role as Shadow Leader of the house after the election of Keir Starmer as the Leader of the Labour Party.

She returned to the backbenches on 9 May 2021 in the 2021 British shadow cabinet reshuffle

On 24 May 2021, Vaz was criticised after she suggested that the condition of Boris Johnson was exaggerated when he was in intensive care with COVID-19.

Vaz is chair of the All-Party Parliamentary Group on Epilepsy.

Personal and family life
Vaz is married to Paul Townsend. The couple have one daughter. Her hobbies include music and gardening. Her younger brother Keith Vaz was the Labour MP for Leicester East from 1987 to 2019, while her sister Penny is a lawyer. Her late mother Merlyn Vaz was formerly a Labour councillor in Leicester.

She is a Catholic.

References

External links

Valerie Vaz MP official website

 Candidate Valerie Vaz at the Daily Telegraph

|-

1954 births
Living people
Alumni of Bedford College, London
British politicians of Indian descent
British Roman Catholics
Councillors in the London Borough of Ealing
English people of Indian descent
Female members of the Parliament of the United Kingdom for English constituencies
People from Aden
Labour Party (UK) councillors
Labour Party (UK) MPs for English constituencies
People from East Sheen
People from Twickenham
British people of Goan descent
UK MPs 2010–2015
UK MPs 2015–2017
UK MPs 2017–2019
UK MPs 2019–present
21st-century British women politicians
Members of the Privy Council of the United Kingdom
BBC television presenters
21st-century English women
21st-century English people
Women councillors in England